Beyond the Sea is the first Japanese album of K, featuring the popular "Only Human", theme song to the drama 1 Litre of Tears. It was released in CD+DVD and CD-only formats, with the CD+DVD being a limited release, featuring a short clip titled the prologue of K, describing the artist's debut.

Track listing

CD

DVD
the prologue of K (6:02)
Introduction
over... Demo Video
Girlfriend Demo Video
One Last Cry Demo Video

References
 http://www.k-official.com/

2006 albums
K (singer) albums